Father Noah's Ark is a 1933 Walt Disney Silly Symphonies animated film. It is based on the story of Noah's Ark. The short's musical score is an adaptation of the first dance in Ludwig van Beethoven's 12 Contredanses. The cartoon was released on April 8, 1933.

Plot
The short begins with the building of the Ark. Father Noah makes the plans of the ark and gives commands to its construction. His sons, Ham, Shem and Japheth "build the ark from dawn to dark and make a lot of noise" with some help from the animals, while their wives load up food supplies to see them through the flood and Noah's wife is washing clothes.

Eventually, the storm rolls in and the animals are summoned, two-by-two, to the ark, purposely leaving two skunks behind. The ark is soon buffeted around by the storm and the ark's occupants praise to the Lord. At one point, Noah gets rainwater leaking through the ceiling in his mouth and has to open a porthole to spit it out, whereupon he is chased by a stray lightning bolt, which he lets out through another porthole.

40 days later, the storm recedes and a dove, carrying an olive branch, flies back to Noah and his family to signify that land has been found. They lower the gangway and the animals all come back out onto dry land (the ark, in this case, resting atop a tree).

Reception 
The Pomp and Circumstance segment of Fantasia 2000, also based on Noah's Ark, makes minor references to this short.

Home media
The short was released on December 4, 2001, on Walt Disney Treasures: Silly Symphonies - The Historic Musical Animated Classics and on the UK VHS of Dumbo as a bonus feature.

Voice cast
 Noah: Allan Watson
 Noah's Sons' Wives: The Rhythmettes
 Noah's Wife: Lucille La Verne
 "Who built the ark?": Jesse Delos Jewkes

References

External links 
 

1933 films
1930s color films
1933 short films
1930s Disney animated short films
Films directed by Wilfred Jackson
Films produced by Walt Disney
Noah's Ark in film
Silly Symphonies
1933 animated films
Films scored by Leigh Harline
1930s American films